Bobrowiec may refer to the following places:
Bobrowiec, Łódź Voivodeship (central Poland)
Bobrowiec, Masovian Voivodeship (east-central Poland)
Bobrowiec, Pomeranian Voivodeship (north Poland)
Bobrowiec, Warmian-Masurian Voivodeship (north Poland)